Edward Douglas Morgan (30 March 1886 – 21 November 1958) was an Australian rules footballer who played with Geelong in the Victorian Football League (VFL).

Notes

External links 

1886 births
1958 deaths
VFL/AFL players born outside Australia
Australian rules footballers from Victoria (Australia)
Geelong Football Club players